Sungor (Assangorior Assangor) is a language of eastern Chad and western Sudan. It is spoken in an area located to the south of Biltine and to the north of Adré in Chad.

It is a member of the Taman language family. The majority of native speakers are Muslim and most use Chadian Arabic as a second language. This community occupies precisely the northern part of the city of Adre. The department of Assoungha is relative to this tribe. Its population is estimated at more than 250,000.Ethnologue lists the Erenga (ereŋa) dialect under Tama. It is spoken to the north and east of Geneina (Jeneina), Darfur.

References

Guinet, X. 1973. Esquisse d’une phonologie du Sungor. in Boyeldieu, P. (éd.), Problèmes de phonologie, Bibliothèque de la SELAF, 38 :73-100.
Nachtigal, G. 1938. Die Sprache der Sungor in Wadai. [J. Lukas ed.] Mitteilungen der Ausland- Hochschule und Universität'', Berlin, 41: 171-246.

External links
 Erenga basic lexicon at the Global Lexicostatistical Database

Taman languages
Languages of Sudan
Languages of Chad